Butte is a sector of Besançon, located in the center of the city.

History

Geography 
The area is located near the historical center, near Grette and Saint-Ferjeux

Education 
 Public Kindergarten of Butte 
 Public Primary School of Butte 
 Lyceum of Jules Haag

Buildings military 
 The barracks Joffre 
 The barracks Brown

Administrative Buildings 
 Prison of Besançon 
 Chamber of Commerce and Industry of Doubs 
 Departmental Directorate of Equipment 
 Polyclinic storks 
 Harass National 
 Postal sorting center 
 Municipal workshops

Transport 
The sector is served by the line 1, 6 and 27

See also 
 Grette
 The 408

Sources 
 French page about Butte

Areas of Besançon